Mapuata Cédric Makiadi (born 23 February 1984) is a Congolese former professional footballer who played as a midfielder. Makiadi spent most of his career in Germany, playing senior football for VfL Wolfsburg, MSV Duisburg, SC Freiburg and Werder Bremen, and concluded his career spending one season at Turkish club Çaykur Rizespor. At international level, he earned 22 caps scoring two goals with the DR Congo national team.

Early and personal life
Born in Kinshasa, Makiadi moved to Germany at the age of eight and also holds German citizenship. His father, Richard Mapuata N'Kiambi, and two brothers, Fabrice and Matondo, are also footballers.

Club career

In summer 2013, Makiadi joined Werder Bremen. On 27 August 2015, Werder Bremen announced Makiadi's departure for Çaykur Rizespor on a free transfer. He left the club at the end of the season before retiring.

International career
Makiadi rejected a call up from the DR Congo national team for the 2006 Africa Cup of Nations, before declaring his national allegiance in February 2007. Makiadi made his international debut later that same year. In December 2014, he was named in the 29-man provisional squad for the 2015 Africa Cup of Nations.

Honours
DR Congo
 Africa Cup of Nations third place: 2015

References

External links

 
 
 
 

1984 births
Living people
Naturalized citizens of Germany
German sportspeople of Democratic Republic of the Congo descent
Democratic Republic of the Congo footballers
German footballers
Association football midfielders
Democratic Republic of the Congo international footballers
2013 Africa Cup of Nations players
2015 Africa Cup of Nations players
Bundesliga players
2. Bundesliga players
Süper Lig players
VfL Wolfsburg players
VfL Wolfsburg II players
MSV Duisburg players
SC Freiburg players
SV Werder Bremen players
Çaykur Rizespor footballers
Democratic Republic of the Congo expatriate footballers
German expatriate footballers
Democratic Republic of the Congo expatriate sportspeople in Germany
Expatriate footballers in Germany
Democratic Republic of the Congo expatriate sportspeople in Turkey
Expatriate footballers in Turkey